Ryan Rodney Cox (9 April 1979 – 1 August 2007) was a South African professional road racing cyclist. He had been cycling since 1987 and turned professional in 2000. He first joined  but changed the following year to Team Cologne which was based in Germany. He had been a member of Team Barloworld since 2003. In 2004 and 2005 he won the South African National Road Race Championships.

Cox died at Kempton Park Hospital when the main artery in his left leg burst, three weeks after a vascular lesion operation in France for a knotted artery.

Major achievements 

2000
 4th Road race, National Road Championships
2001
 2nd Time trial, National Road Championships
2002
 National Road Championships
2nd Road race
3rd Time trial
2003
 1st Stage 1 Circuit des Mines
 5th Tour du Doubs
 10th Overall Giro del Friuli Venezia Giulia
 10th Tour du Jura
2004
 National Road Championships
1st  Road race
4th Time trial
 1st  Overall Tour of Qinghai Lake
1st Stage 1
 2nd Overall Tour de Langkawi
 9th Overall Giro del Capo
1st Stage 4 (ITT)
2005
 National Road Championships
1st  Road race
2nd Time trial
 1st  Overall Tour de Langkawi
1st  Mountains classification
1st Stage 8
 2nd Overall UCI Africa Tour
 2nd Overall UCI Asia Tour
 2nd Overall Giro del Capo
1st Mountains classification
 6th Subida al Naranco
 10th Overall Tour of Qinghai Lake
1st Stage 6
2006
 3rd Overall Giro del Capo
2007
 5th Overall Giro del Capo

References

External links 
 SA cyclist Ryan Cox dies
 Profile on Ryan Cox's Official Site
 Thank you Ryan, we will never forget you
 SA cyclist Cox loses fight for his life

1979 births
2007 deaths
South African male cyclists
Olympic cyclists of South Africa
Cyclists at the 2004 Summer Olympics
Cyclists at the 2006 Commonwealth Games
White South African people
Commonwealth Games competitors for South Africa